The 2019 Suzuka 10 Hours was an endurance event that took place on August 25, 2019 at the Suzuka Circuit in Suzuka City, Japan. It was the 48th edition of the Summer Endurance Classic at Suzuka, and the third round of the 2019 Intercontinental GT Challenge. Due to the effects of the COVID-19 pandemic, this is the most recent running of the Suzuka Summer Endurance Classic as of 2022.

Entry list

Qualifying

Super Pole

These were the 20 fastest cars in qualifying

Race

Race Results

Notes

References

External links
 Official website

Suzuka 10 Hours
Suzuka
Suzuka